Pseudomyrmex gracilis, also known as the graceful twig ant, Mexican twig ant, slender twig ant, or elongated twig ant,  is a large, slender species native to Mexico and arid parts of the US. Worker ants are bi-colored; the head and gaster are dark, while the antennae, mouthparts, thorax and legs are dull orange with dark shading. They often may be seen on vegetation, foraging for live insects or collecting honeydew from sap-sucking insects.

If the colony ever finds themselves without a queen, the worker ants form dominance hierarchies by boxing with their antennae. This leads to a couple high ranking individuals to lay eggs until a new queen returns.

Photos

References

Further reading 
 Volker S. Schmid; Martin Kaltenpoth; Erhard Strohm & Jürgen Heinze (2013) "Worker self-restraint and policing maintain the queen’s reproductive monopoly in a pseudomyrmecine ant pp. 1

External links

University of Florida

Insects described in 1804
Pseudomyrmecinae
Hymenoptera of North America